Isaac N. Snook (1848–1931) was an American politician.

Snook was born in Union County, Pennsylvania, in 1848. The family, which included eight children, settled in Lee County, Iowa, in June 1854. Snook married Rachel Box in 1871. The couple had six children. By the time their eldest daughter was fifteen, Box had died. Snook maintained his farm and threshing business for five decades and was president of the Iowa Threshermen's Association for fourteen years. He held several township offices, including tenure as a justice of the peace for sixteen years, prior to his election to the Iowa Senate in 1922. He represented District 1 from 1923 to 1927 as a Democrat. Lee died on 2 November 1931.

References

1848 births
1931 deaths
20th-century American politicians
American justices of the peace
Farmers from Iowa
Democratic Party Iowa state senators
People from Union County, Pennsylvania
People from Lee County, Iowa
County officials in Iowa